Thurgood Marshall High School may refer to:
 Thurgood Marshall High School (formerly known as Conecuh County Training School) in Evergreen, Alabama
 Thurgood Marshall High School (Maryland)
 Thurgood Marshall High School (Ohio)
 Thurgood Marshall High School (Texas)
 Thurgood Marshall Academic High School, a school in the San Francisco Unified School District
 Thurgood Marshall Academy, Washington, D.C.
 Thurgood Marshall Academy for Learning and Social Change, Harlem, New York